Federica Curiazzi (born 14 August 1992) is an Italian racewalker.

Achievements
Senior

See also
 Italian all-time lists – 50 km walk
 Italian team at the running events

References

External links
 
 Federica Curiazzi at Marcia dal mondo 

1992 births
Living people
Italian female racewalkers
Sportspeople from Bergamo